Reference data is a catch all term used in the finance industry to describe counterparty and security identifiers used when making a trade.  As opposed to market data the reference data is used to complete financial transactions and settle those transactions. The financial service industry and regulatory agencies have pursued a policy of standardizing the reference data that define and describe such transactions.

At its most basic level, reference data for a simple sale of a stock in exchange for cash on a highly liquid stock exchange that involves a standard label for the underlying security (e.g., its ISIN), the identity of the seller, the buyer, the broker-dealer(s), the price, etc. At its most complex, reference data covers all relevant particulars for highly complex transactions with multiple dependencies, entities, and contingencies.

History

Standardisation efforts
The background for this policy is the risk that transactions fail and are reversed because contractual terms were misunderstood or ambiguous. In addition, the lag between the trade and ultimate settlement of the transaction may include various events that affect various elements of the transaction.

Efforts to standardize reference data are complicated by a number of factors, including:
 Semantic differences in common terminology
 The sheer number of data elements that make up transactions
 Rapidly changing markets, products, and underlying events
 Static Data 
 Dynamic Data
 Bounded Data

As a result, work to standardize reference data is broadly considered to be an ongoing effort rather than a series of discrete programs.

Types of Data 
There are many fields included in reference data.  Some of the most common include:
 Instrument classification (e.g., large vs small, tenor, region, sector)
 Sale information (e.g., ISIN, seller identity, buyer, price)
 Market Identifier Codes (ISO 10383 MIC)

See also
 Clearing house (finance)
 Electronic trading platform
 Financial Information eXchange
 FpML
 International Swaps and Derivatives Association
 ISIN
 Legal Entity Identifier
 Market data
 Same-day affirmation
 Straight through processing

References

Financial markets
Financial metadata
Settlement (finance)